Slacker Cats is an American adult animated sitcom that aired on ABC Family on August 13, 2007. It was created using Adobe Flash.

When the show was first announced, due to an initial lack of information, and its presence on ABC Family, many outlets erroneously believed Slacker Cats was aimed towards children. However, in later advertising and in press kits issued to the media, it was clearly indicated that the show included a more adult tone and themes.  The show's 10PM broadcast time further illustrated that its target was an adult audience. It was the fourth adult animated series produced by Disney, the other three being The PJs, which aired on Fox, Clerks: The Animated Series, which aired on ABC, and Clone High, which was a co-production of MTV, Teletoon and Nelvana, and is the only adult animated show from them at the time to not be produced at Touchstone Television, now known as ABC Signature.

Slacker Cats was animated by Film Roman, the same company that animates The Simpsons and its movie and King of the Hill, and produced by Laika. It features the voice talents of comedians Harland Williams and Sinbad in the lead roles. It was created by Andy Riley and Kevin Cecil, who also served as executive producers along with animation director Seth Kearsley, who designed the characters.

Slacker Cats was canceled on September 17, 2007, after six episodes. A second season premiered on the ABC Family website on January 19, 2009, and was released on iTunes and Xbox Live Marketplace.  The second season was numbered as a continuation of the first season, episodes 7 through 12.

Plot
Slacker Cats is about two cats and their quotidian, strange and outrageous adventures. Main plots of the show revolve around Buckley and Eddie's schemes to escape the everyday monotony of being house cats by taking advantage of humans (as well as other cats) to freewheel themselves in the fictional city of Wendell, California.

Cast and characters

Buckley
One of the two main protagonists of Slacker Cats, along with Eddie. He is a cat owned by Louise, living in her apartment. He is clever by cat standards, but he thinks he is much more clever than he really is, which causes him and Eddie to encounter a lot of trouble. He secretly wants to be human, feeling that life is limited as a cat. His best friend is Eddie, who is often the cause of his mishaps. Buckley is also the constant nemesis of Mrs. Boots for reasons that remain unknown. He is in love with his owner Louise and plans on marrying her, but she doesn't return his feelings. Despite his unreturned feelings, he still addresses her as if she were his girlfriend. Buckley's personality fluctuates from being lazy and uncaring to being remotely active and feeling guilty. He is notably more ethical than Eddie. Buckley also shows an aggressive side, attacking his friend Tabitha and removing her remaining ear, though it was later reattached. Voiced by Harland Williams.

Eddie
One of the two main protagonists of Slacker Cats, along with Buckley.  He, like most other characters, is a cat. His owner is Dan, who looks surprisingly like him. Eddie is Buckley's best friend, though he rarely acts like it.  He's extremely egotistical about himself, even to the point of kissing a dummy replica of himself (seen in episode 6.) Eddie often speaks of his way with lady cats and past events that involve numerous lady cats at one time, although there is no evidence of this. However, he's stated by other characters to be more of a "tough alley cat" than a normal Californian house cat, hinting Eddie could actually be somewhat of a ladies man.  Yet at the same time is also shown to be very desperate, including going far out of his way and hurting himself/friends to get attention from female cats. He knows Buckley is in love with his owner, Louise, and often makes fun of him for it, calling him a "sicko" or an "Ownerphile" whenever he looks at something human related. However, he will still stand up for Buckley, normally against Mrs. Boots asking "Where is Mr. Boots?" which causes her run off angrily every time. Voiced by Sinbad.

Tabitha
She is cat whose owner is unknown and may be a stray because of her neglected appearance.  However, in episode 5 she admits to have once have had an owner but since then had forgotten who it was. She has one ear, which has a bow on it and the other seems to have been mostly bitten off. She is also often shown carrying a small green purse. She is not too bright, but she is cheery and believes she is everyone's friend. Of all the people in Wendell, she enjoys spending time with Buckley and Eddie, much to their annoyance. Whenever she sees them and tries to talk she is given an excuse by Eddie why they are too busy or tells her to wait somewhere for them, often somewhere dangerous. She is willing to forgive anything, including being left in the middle of a highway or having her ear ripped off by Buckley. She often shows characteristics of bipolar disorder, going from cheery to standing over Louise (whom she duct-taped to her bed) with a scalpel and directions on how to perform a "reverse conjoined twin separation" on her.  Voiced by Kiersten Warren.

Dooper
Dooper is a stray cat that lives in a cardboard box in an alley near Louise's apartment. He is afraid of almost everything and is quite nervous. As a result of this he is constantly coming up with outlandish conspiracy theories and rushes to warn everyone. The closest things to friends he has are Buckley and Eddie, whom he normally tells his theories to first. They usually ignore him, but sometimes use his conspiracy theories to trick him into doing their dirty work. He will often find small, everyday things like a crack in the pavement and use it as proof of his theories. Also it is said that Dooper doesn't have any testicles, suggesting that he once had an owner who had him neutered. Voiced by Emo Philips.

Mrs. Boots
She is a cat whose owner is unknown but her owner's family is shown to be wealthy as she lives in a mansion. She is Buckley's nemesis and tries to thwart his plans in any way she can. The reason why she hates Buckley remains unknown. Her name derives from the difference in color of her body and her paws. She is all light grey except for her paws which are dark brown. She is very self-conscious about them, calling them "deformities" and hiding them in her fur when she sits. She is also self-conscious about her name, always becoming aggravated when Eddie asks "Where's Mr. Boots?". She shows herself as a classy cat, but has a short temper and when angry starts to yell and her voice becomes a little bit hoarse.  Voiced by Niecy Nash.

Louise
She is one of the only main human characters and is Buckley's owner.  Technically their relationship can be viewed as somewhat closer as humans can understand cats and vice versa on the show, but she still treats him as her pet for the most part.  Buckley has a romantic infatuation with Louise and hopes to one day consummate their relationship, although she is oblivious to the fact. Buckley even said that he once proposed to her. Voiced by Nicole Sullivan.

Ingrid and Latoyah
Best friends who Eddie thinks are hot. Ingrid and Latoyah are voiced by Masasa Moyo and Alex Borstein.

Series overview

Episodes

Season 1 (2007)

Season 2 (2009)

Production 
The original 2001 pilot was animated in claymation by Laika's predecessor, Will Vinton Studios, done in the same model and animation style as Gary & Mike, which Hardland Williams voiced Mike. The series was pitched to The WB, who turned it down. The pilot has a different art style from the final version. It also has a different voice cast, except for Tabitha.

References

External links

 

2000s American adult animated television series
2000s American sitcoms
2007 American television series debuts
2009 American television series endings
American adult animated comedy television series
American animated sitcoms
American flash adult animated television series
American television series revived after cancellation
English-language television shows
ABC Family original programming
Television shows set in California
Animated television series about cats
Television series by Disney–ABC Domestic Television
Television series by Film Roman